Odense is the third largest city in Denmark and capital of the island of Funen.

Odense may also refer to:

 Odense Municipality, Denmark
 Odense Boldklub, a Danish professional football club based in Odense.
 Odense County, a former Danish province
 Roman Catholic bishopric of Odense, of which it was the episcopal see
 Odense River
 Odense Fjord
 Odense Steel Shipyard also known as Odense Staalskibsværft - Lindøværftet
 Odense Airport
 Odense Classic or Odense Pilsner brewed by Albani Bryggerierne A/S
 Symphony, K. 16a (Mozart), symphony attributed to Mozart
 Odense, Kansas, an unincorporated community